Shasta is a census-designated place (CDP) in Shasta County, California, United States. Its population is 1,043 as of the 2020 census, down from 1,771 from the 2010 census.

Shasta State Historic Park located at Shasta is a ghost town and California State Historic Park.

History
A bustling town of the 1850s through the 1880s, Shasta was for its time, the largest settlement in Shasta County and the surrounding area. Sometimes referred to today as "Old Shasta", the town was an important commercial center and a major shipping point for mule trains and stagecoaches serving the mining towns and later settlements of northern California.  The discovery of gold near Shasta in 1848 brought California Gold Rush-era Forty-Niners up the Siskiyou Trail in search of riches - most passed through Shasta, and continued to use it as base of operations.  Those that stayed worked the placer gold diggings of nearby, short-lived camps like Horsetown, Buckeye, and Whiskeytown, California.

Situated about six miles (10 km) west of Redding, California along Highway 299, Shasta was once home to some 3,500 residents, the county seat, and a thriving commercial district.  However, in 1873, the under construction Oregon-bound branch of the Central Pacific Railroad bypassed Shasta, in favor of Redding and the town began its decline into near "ghost town" status.  In 1888, Shasta lost the county seat to Redding.  By the twentieth century, and after several fires, a distinctive row of gold rush era buildings remained along its Main Street, which attracted preservationists and their efforts to save all the local stories and landscape, and the remaining first generation of 1850s brick and iron door architecture.

The poet Joaquin Miller refers to Shasta in his 1870s novel, Life Amongst the Modocs, based on the experiences of Miller as a young man living in the area in the 1850s.   In this book, Miller describes his brief imprisonment in a Shasta jail for horse-stealing and subsequent escape with the aid of his Native American wife.

Shasta State Historic Park
The site of the town is now a California State Historic Park called Shasta State Historic Park, containing many of the original 19th century brick buildings, partially restored. Shasta is now a town with the ruins of the gold mining town, a post office, a church, the oldest Masonic lodge in California, and a store.

The park was damaged by the Carr Fire in 2018, during which the elementary school was destroyed and the brewery and cemetery were damaged.

Geography
According to the United States Census Bureau, the CDP covers an area of 11.0 square miles (28.4 km), 99.96% of it land and 0.04% of it water.

Demographics
The 2010 United States Census reported that Shasta had a population of 1,771. The racial makeup of Shasta was 1,612 (91.0%) White, 11 (0.6%) African American, 37 (2.1%) Native American, 23 (1.3%) Asian, 1 (0.1%) Pacific Islander, 7 (0.4%) from other races, and 80 (4.5%) from two or more races. Hispanic or Latino of any race were 56 persons (3.2%).

The Census reported that 1,771 people (100% of the population) lived in households, 0 (0%) lived in non-institutionalized group quarters, and 0 (0%) were institutionalized.

There were 723 households,  the average family size was 2.79.

The population was spread out, with 339 people (19.1%) under the age of 18, 96 people (5.4%) aged 18 to 24, 291 people (16.4%) aged 25 to 44, 716 people (40.4%) aged 45 to 64, and 329 people (18.6%) who were 65 years of age or older.  The median age was 50.6 years. For every 100 females, there were 106.7 males.  For every 100 females age 18 and over, there were 101.7 males.

The homeowner vacancy rate was 1.7%; the rental vacancy rate was 5.5%.  1,507 people (85.1% of the population) lived in owner-occupied housing units and 264 people (14.9%) lived in rental housing units.

Politics

Notable people
 Jim Hanks, actor, brother of Tom Hanks, was born in Shasta.
 Bronco Charlie Miller, horse trainer and Pony Express rider

References

External links
Official Shasta State Historic Park website
Shasta: the ghost town today
Museum of the Siskiyou Trail website
Friends of Shasta State Historic Park website

California State Historic Parks
Census-designated places in Shasta County, California
Mining communities of the California Gold Rush
Museums in Shasta County, California
History of Shasta County, California
Open-air museums in California
History museums in California
Ghost towns in California
Parks in Shasta County, California
Populated places established in 1848
1848 establishments in California
Census-designated places in California